The 1979 U.S. Figure Skating Championships took place in Cincinnati, Ohio from January 30 to February 3. Medals were awarded in three colors: gold (first), silver (second), and bronze (third) in four disciplines – men's singles, ladies' singles, pair skating, and ice dancing – across three levels: senior, junior, and novice.

The event determined the U.S. teams for the 1979 World Figure Skating Championships.

Senior results

Men

Ladies

Pairs

Ice dancing

Junior results

Men

Ladies

Pairs

Ice dancing

Novice results

Men

Ladies

Pairs

Ice dancing

External links
 NATIONALS 1979

U.S. Figure Skating Championships
United States Figure Skating Championships, 1979
United States Figure Skating Championships, 1979